Kalousek (feminine Kalousková) is a Czech surname. Notable people with the surname include:

 Jiří Kalousek (born 1929), Czech illustrator and animator
 Josef Kalousek (1838–1915), Czech historian
 Miroslav Kalousek (born 1960), Czech politician
 Jan Kalousek (born 1961), Czech singer
 David Kalousek (born 1975), Czech footballer

Czech-language surnames